Adam Frederick Zemke (born June 4, 1983) is a former member of the Michigan House of Representatives. He represented Michigan's 55th district, encompassing the cities of Ann Arbor (portion) and Milan (portion) and the townships of Ann Arbor, Augusta, Pittsfield, and York in Washtenaw County, since January 1, 2013, having been re-elected in November 2014 and November 2016.

Early life, education and family 
Zemke was born and raised in Ann Arbor, Michigan. His parents, Debra Lehto and Frederick Zemke, divorced when he was a toddler. He spent much of his childhood in Michigan, attending Haisley Elementary, Forsythe Middle and Pioneer High schools in the Ann Arbor Public Schools district. He also attended Princeton High school while his then-stepfather, Dr. Trevor Wooley, worked at the Institute for Advanced Study in Princeton, NJ. Adam has one brother, Cameron Wooley, and a sister, Michelle Zemke—both younger.

Following high school, Zemke enrolled and attended Michigan State University. He studied Mechanical Engineering and obtained undergraduate and master's degrees in this field. In spring 2005, Zemke served as the commencement speaker for his graduating class of the College of Engineering.

Zemke's family has deep roots in Washtenaw County. His father's family first emigrated to Ann Arbor and settled on Spring street in the early 1890s. They are of German ancestry. While in Ann Arbor, Zemke's great grandfather owned and operated The Orient, a well-known "townie" pool hall and barber shop on the corner of North Main and Ann streets. 

In 1935, his grandfather Frederick "Fritz" Zemke left the University of Michigan to start a business out of his parents' Spring Street garage, operating vending machines and jukeboxes in local establishments. This business, called Zemke Operated Machines, is run by Zemke's father and has remained in continuous operation to this day.

Formula SAE 

While in college, Zemke was a member of the Formula SAE team, something that he frequently discusses as being impactful to his educational experience. He participated in this program and was involved in the design, build, test and racing of the 2005, 2006, 2007 and 2008 vehicles. He served as project manager for the 2006 and 2008 vehicles, the latter of which placed 4th at the Formula SAE West competition in Fontana, CA. At the 2006 Fontana competition, Zemke made a connection with Jay Leno than led to Mr. Leno inviting the MSU Formula SAE Team to his Big Dog Garage in Burbank, CA for an exposé on the Formula SAE competition. Zemke remains a strong supporter of Formula SAE, serving as Presentation Event Captain and a member of the organizing committee for the competition held annually in Michigan. He also serves on the board of trustees for the SAE Foundation, helping to encourage STEAM educational experiences for pre-K through high school students in classrooms all over the country.

Private sector career 
Following the completion of his master's degree, Zemke joined Demmer Corporation as a project lead engineer in their machining division. He worked on projects predominantly in the defense and commercial aerospace industries. A year after joining the company, Zemke was promoted to Program Manager, where he was one of two engineers tasked with helping to grow Demmer Corporation's presence in the private plane and commercial aerospace markets.

During a company trip to Wichita, Kansas, Zemke and his colleague visited a factory where production had slowed significantly during the recession. Upon asking what contributing factors were to the production decline, workers discussed that following the media converge of the automotive hearings in the United States Senate where CEOs who flew on private planes were chastised by senators, many corporations cancelled their private plane orders.

Electoral history

2010 Washtenaw County Board of Commissioners 

Zemke first ran for public office in 2010, running for a Republican-held open seat on the Washtenaw County Board of Commissioners. In the Republican-wave general election that November, Zemke lost to Republican Rob Turner by 723 votes.

2012 Michigan House of Representatives 

In 2012, Zemke ran for the 55th district in the Michigan House of Representatives; a seat that was held by Republican Rick Olsen, who declined to run due to changes in the district boundaries following the 2011 reapportionment. Zemke faced Pittsfield Township Trustee Andrea Brown-Harrison in the Democratic primary election, where he won with 63% of the vote. He then faced Republican former Milan Mayor Owen Diaz in the general election where Zemke won the election with 64% of the vote.

2014 Michigan House of Representatives 

Zemke was unopposed in the Democratic primary election of 2014 and faced Republican Leonard Burke in the general election. Zemke won the election with nearly 68% of the vote.

2016 Michigan House of Representatives 

Zemke was unopposed in the Democratic primary election of 2016 and faced Republican Bob Baird of Ann Arbor in the general election. Zemke won the election with over 69% of the vote.

Michigan House Democratic Caucus Campaign Chairpersonship 
Following the start of the 98th (2015–16) Michigan legislature, Democratic Leader Tim Greimel (D-Auburn Hills) selected Zemke and Representative Pam Faris (D-Clio) to serve as chairpersons for the 2016 House Democratic campaign team and Representative Andy Schor (D-Lansing) as chairperson of the 2016 House Democratic finance team. Representative Faris later resigned from her position. In these roles, Representatives Greimel, Zemke and Schor led the campaign for a Democratic majority in the Michigan House of Representatives.

Driving 30,000 miles around Michigan 

In his role as Campaign Chairperson, Zemke drove his Ford Contour SVT approximately 30,000 miles around the state helping Democratic candidates campaign for the Michigan House of Representatives. On October 27, 2016, Zemke was driving from Escanaba in the western Upper Peninsula to Kalkaska in the northern Lower Peninsula when his odometer turned 300,000 miles.

Michigan House Democratic Caucus Chairpersonship 
At the start of the 99th (2017–18) Michigan legislature, Zemke ran for election to become Chair of the House Democratic Caucus for the two-year term that comprises the 99th session of the Michigan House of Representatives. He won this election on January 12, 2017 and began the position immediately.

References

Democratic Party members of the Michigan House of Representatives
Politicians from Ann Arbor, Michigan
Michigan State University alumni
Living people
21st-century American politicians
1983 births